Frances Radclyffe may refer to:

 Frances Radclyffe, Countess of Sussex nee Sidney (1531–1589), attendant of Elizabeth I
Lady Frances Radclyffe (died 1602), Maid of Honour to Elizabeth I

See also
Francis Radclyffe (disambiguation), for the male version of the name